Yuraq Qaqa (Quechua yuraq white, qaqa rock, "white rock", also spelled Yuraj Kaka) is a mountain in the Bolivian Andes which reaches a height of approximately . It is located in the Potosí Department, at the border of the Antonio Quijarro Province, Porco Municipality, and the José María Linares Province, Caiza "D" Municipality. It lies at the Tapial Mayu, southwest of Qanchis Kancha.

References 

Mountains of Potosí Department